The Ian Woodner Family Collection is a foundation that Ian Woodner established before his death in 1990. Woodner's two daughters, Dian and Andrea, oversee the Collection. 

Ian Woodner, a real estate developer, was one of the greatest art collectors in the United States. Besides an extraordinary group of drawings, some of which were acquired by the National Gallery of Art in Washington in 1991, he amassed a large group of Cycladic works of art.  He had a passion for paintings, drawings and prints by the 19th-century French artist Odilon Redon and put together the largest group of Redons in the world. In June 2000, the foundation gave the Museum of Modern Art nearly 100 paintings, pastels, watercolors, drawings, prints and illustrated books by Odilon Redon.

References

Arts organizations based in New York City
Private collections in the United States